Hawul is a Local Government Area of Borno State, Nigeria. It's located in the southern part of the state.

Is headquarters are in the town of  Azare.
 
It has an area of 2,098 km and a population of about 120,000 at the 2006 census.

The postal code of the area is 603.

It is one of the four LGAs that constitute the Biu Emirate, a traditional state located in Borno State, Nigeria.

References

Local Government Areas in Borno State